Samuel MacLean Gilmour (28 April 1905-1970) was a Canadian New Testament scholar, professor at Queen's Theological College, Norris Professor of New Testament at Andover Newton Theological School, and President of the Canadian Society of Biblical Studies and of the Canadian Section of the Society of Biblical Literature and Exegesis. S. MacLean Gilmour also was member of the Editorial Committee of the Journal of Biblical Literature and a member of the Studiorum Novi Testamenti Societas.

Contributions

Sources of the Gospel according to Luke 
MacLean Gilmour proposed various theories about the sources that were used in the Gospel According to Luke. Gilmour "argued against Streeter and Taylor that Q+L constituted a complete Gospel and formed the structure upon which Luke the Evangelist composed his own Gospel." Gilmour added that even when Luke made Mark the basis of his own Gospel, in The passion narrative reviewed that material of his own Gospel and enriched it "with material of his own composition".  Analyzing Gilmour's proposals and his antithesis, Xavier Léon-Dufour evaluated Gilmour's hypothesis as "brilliant among the criticism".

Works

Thesis

Books

Chapters

Selected journal articles

Translation

 - translation of the 1972 German title.

References

New Testament scholars
Andover Newton Theological School faculty
University of Chicago alumni
University of Manitoba alumni